The Prime Minister of Kazakhstan (Kazakh Cyrillic: Қазақстан Республикасының Премьер-Министрі, Kazakh Latin: Qazaqstan Respublikasynyñ Premier-Ministrı,) is the head of government of the Republic of Kazakhstan and the holder of its second highest office, after the president of Kazakhstan. The prime minister heads the cabinet and advises the president in the every day execution of the functions of the Parliament of Kazakhstan.

During the Soviet period, the post was formerly known as the chairman of the Council of Ministers of the Kazakh Soviet Socialist Republic prior to its independence in 1991.

The current incumbent prime minister is Alihan Smaiylov, who replaced Askar Mamin on 5 January 2022 in the wake of the 2022 protests.

List (1917–present)
This is a list of prime ministers of Kazakhstan from the establishment of the office in 1917 to the present day.

Alash Autonomy (1917–1920)

Kyrgyz Autonomous Soviet Socialist Republic (1920–1925)

Chairmen of the Council of People's Commissars
Viktor Radus Zenkovich (12 October 1920 – 1921)
Mukhamedkhafiy Murzagaliyev (1921 – September 1922)
Saken Seyfullin (September 1922 – October 1924)
Nygmet Nurmakov (October 1924 – 19 February 1925)

Kazakh Autonomous Soviet Socialist Republic (1925–1936)

Chairmen of the Council of People's Commissars
Nygmet Nurmakov (19 February 1925 – May 1928)
Uraz Isayev (May 1928 – 5 December 1936)

Kazakh Soviet Socialist Republic (1936–1991)

Chairmen of the Council of People's Commissars
Uraz Isayev (5 December 1936 – September 1937)
Ibragim Tazhiyev (September 1937 – 17 July 1938)
Nurtas Undasynov (17 July 1938 – 15 March 1946)

Chairmen of the Council of Ministers
Nurtas Undasynov(15 March 1946 – 24 March 1954)
Elubai Taibekov (24 March 1954 – 31 March 1955)
Dinmukhamed Kunaev (31 March 1955 – 20 January 1960) (1st time)
Zhumabek Tashenev (20 January 1960 – 6 January 1961)
Salken Daulenov (6 January 1961 – 13 September 1962)
Masymkhan Beysembayev (13 September – 26 December 1962) (1st time)
Dinmukhamed Kunaev (26 December 1962 – 7 December 1964) (2nd time)
Masymkhan Beysembayev (7 December 1964 – 31 March 1970) (2nd time)
Bayken Ashimov (31 March 1970 – 22 March 1984)
Nursultan Nazarbayev (22 March 1984 – 27 July 1989)
Uzakbay Karamanov (27 July 1989 – 20 November 1990)

Prime Minister
Uzakbay Karamanov (20 November 1990 – 14 October 1991)
Sergey Tereshchenko (16 October – 16 December 1991)

Republic of Kazakhstan (1991–present)

Prime ministers

Timeline

See also
List of leaders of Kazakhstan
President of Kazakhstan
Vice President of Kazakhstan

References

External links
 Official Site of the Prime Minister of Kazakhstan
 PrimeMinister.kz on YouTube

Kazakhstan
Politics of Kazakhstan
Government of Kazakhstan
1991 establishments in Kazakhstan